is a 2018 Japanese film directed by Isao Yukisada. It is based on a manga of the same title by Kyoko Okazaki. It was screened in the Panorama section at the 68th Berlin International Film Festival.

Cast
 Fumi Nikaidō as Haruna Wakakusa 
 Ryo Yoshizawa as Ichiro Yamada 
 Shuhei Uesugi as Kannonzaki 
 Sumire Chara as Kozue Yoshikawa
 Shiori Doi as Rumi 
 Aoi Morikawa as Kannna Tajima

References

External links
  
 

2018 films
2018 comedy-drama films
Japanese comedy-drama films
2010s Japanese-language films
Films directed by Isao Yukisada
Live-action films based on manga
2010s Japanese films